Peter T. Daniels (born December 11, 1951) is a scholar of writing systems, specializing in typology. He was co-editor (with William Bright) of the book The World's Writing Systems (1996). He was a lecturer at University of Wisconsin–Milwaukee and Chicago State University.

He received degrees in linguistics from Cornell University and the University of Chicago.

Daniels introduced two neologisms for categories of scripts, first published in 1990: abjad (an "alphabet" with no vowel letters, derived from the Arabic term) and abugida (a system of consonant+vowel base syllables modified to denote other or no vowels, derived from the Ethiopic term per a suggestion from Wolf Leslau).

Bibliography
2021. "Hebrew script for Jewish languages: A unique phenomenon." Written Language & Literacy 24, no. 1: 149-165.
2021. "Foundations of graphonomy." Journal of Cultural Cognitive Science 5, no. 2: 113-123.
2020. "Writing and writing systems: Classification of scripts." The International Encyclopedia of Linguistic Anthropology 1-11.
2020. "The Decipherment of Ancient Near Eastern Languages." A Companion to Ancient Near Eastern Languages 1-25.
2018. An Exploration of Writing. Sheffield: Equinox Publishing. 
2008. Grammatology. In Cambridge Handbook of Literacy David R. Olson and Nancy Torrance, (eds.), 25-45. Cambridge: Cambridge University Press.
2007. Littera ex occidente: toward a functional history of writing. In Studies in Semitic and Afroasiatic Linguistics Presented to Gene B. Gragg, Cynthia L. Miller, ed, pp. 53–68. Chicago: University of Chicago Press.
2006. On beyond alphabets. In Script Adjustment and Phonological Awareness, edited by Martin Neef and Guido Nottbusch. Written Language & Literacy. 9(1): 7–24. 
2002 translation: Pierre Briant. From Cyrus to Alexander. A History of the Persian Empire. Eisenbrauns, Warsaw, Indiana. 
1997 Classical Syriac phonology. In Phonologies of Asia and Africa, edited by Kaye. Eisenbrauns, Warsaw, Indiana.
1997 The Protean Arabic Abjad. In Fs. George Krotkoff. Eisenbrauns, Warsaw, Indiana.
1997 Surveys of languages of the world. In Fs. William Bright. de Gruyter.
1996 editor (with William Bright): The World's Writing Systems. Oxford University Press. 
1995 translation: Gotthelf Bergsträsser. Introduction to the Semitic Languages: Text specimens and grammatical sketches. Second edition. Eisenbrauns, Warsaw, Indiana. 
1994 An overlooked ethological datum bearing on the evolution of human language. In LACUS Forum 1994. Linguistic Association of Canada and the United States.
1993 Linguistics in the American library classification systems. In LACUS Forum 1993. Linguistic Association of Canada and the United States.
1992 The Syllabic Origin of Writing and the Segmental Origin of the Alphabet. In Linguistics of Literacy, edited by Downing, Lima, and Noonan. John Benjamins, Amsterdam.
1991 Ha, La, Ha or Hoi, Lawe, Haut: The Ethiopic letter names. In Semitic studies : in honor of Wolf Leslau on the occasion of his eighty-fifth birthday, November 14th, 1991. Alan Kaye, ed. Harrassowitz.
1991 Is a structural grammatology possible? In LACUS Forum 1991. Linguistic Association of Canada and the United States.
1990 Fundamentals of grammatology. Journal of the American Orient Society.
1983 translation: Gotthelf Bergsträsser. Introduction to the Semitic Languages: Text specimens and grammatical sketches. Eisenbrauns, Warsaw, Indiana.

References

External links
review of Peter T. Daniels and William Bright (edd.), The World's Writing Systems

Linguists from the United States
Living people
1951 births